NBA Basketball 2000 is a video game developed by Radical Entertainment and published by Fox Sports Interactive for PlayStation and Microsoft Windows in 1999.

Reception

The PlayStation version received above-average reviews, while the PC version received unfavorable reviews, according to the review aggregation website GameRankings.

Notes

References

External links
 

1999 video games
Fox Interactive games
National Basketball Association video games
PlayStation (console) games
Radical Entertainment games
Video games developed in Canada
Windows games